In the field of functional analysis, DF-spaces, also written (DF)-spaces are locally convex topological vector space having a property that is shared by locally convex metrizable topological vector spaces. They play a considerable part in the theory of topological tensor products. 

Definition 

A locally convex topological vector space (TVS)  is a DF-space, also written (DF)-space, if 

Properties 

Let  be a DF-space and let  be a convex balanced subset of  Then  is a neighborhood of the origin if and only if for every convex, balanced, bounded subset   is a neighborhood of the origin in   Consequently, a linear map from a DF-space into a locally convex space is continuous if its restriction to each bounded subset of the domain is continuous.
The strong dual space of a DF-space is a Fréchet space.
Every infinite-dimensional Montel DF-space is a sequential space but  a Fréchet–Urysohn space.
Suppose  is either a DF-space or an LM-space. If  is a sequential space then it is either metrizable or else a Montel space DF-space.
Every quasi-complete DF-space is complete.
If  is a complete nuclear DF-space then  is a Montel space.

Sufficient conditions 

The strong dual space  of a Fréchet space  is a DF-space. 

The strong dual of a metrizable locally convex space is a DF-space but the convers is in general not true (the converse being the statement that every DF-space is the strong dual of some metrizable locally convex space). From this it follows: 
 Every normed space is a DF-space.
 Every Banach space is a DF-space.
 Every infrabarreled space possessing a fundamental sequence of bounded sets is a DF-space.
Every Hausdorff quotient of a DF-space is a DF-space.
The completion of a DF-space is a DF-space.
The locally convex sum of a sequence of DF-spaces is a DF-space.
An inductive limit of a sequence of DF-spaces is a DF-space.
Then the projective tensor product, as well as its completion, of these spaces is a DF-space.<li>

However,

An infinite product of non-trivial DF-spaces (i.e. all factors have non-0 dimension) is  a DF-space.
A closed vector subspace of a DF-space is not necessarily a DF-space.
There exist complete DF-spaces that are not TVS-isomorphic to the strong dual of a metrizable locally convex TVS.

Examples 

There exist complete DF-spaces that are not TVS-isomorphic with the strong dual of a metrizable locally convex space.
There exist DF-spaces having closed vector subspaces that are not DF-spaces.

See also

Citations

Bibliography

External links 

 DF-space at ncatlab

Topology
Topological vector spaces
Functional analysis